is a district located in Kagoshima Prefecture, Japan. The district covers two islands from the Ōsumi Islands, Tanegashima and Yakushima.

The district has an estimated population of 29,706 with a total area of 789.16 km2, according to 2005 Census.

Contains 3 towns:
Nakatane
Minamitane
Yakushima

History
April 1, 1889 — Due to the town and village status enforcement, the villages of Kitatane, Nakatane, and Minamitane were formed within Kumage District. (3 towns)
March 29, 1896 — Absorbed Gomu District. (5 villages)
April 1, 1926 — The village of Kitatane gained town status and renamed to become the town of Nishinoomote. (1 town, 4 villages)
November 10, 1940 — The village of Nakatane gained town status. (2 towns, 3 villages)
October 15, 1956 — The village of Minamitane gained town status. (3 towns, 2 villages)
April 1, 1958 — The village of Kamiyaku gained town status. (4 towns, 1 village)
October 1, 1958 — The town of Nishinoomote gained city status. (3 towns, 1 village)
April 1, 1959 — The village of Shimoyaku gained town status and renamed to become the town of Yaku. (4 towns)
October 1, 2007 — The towns of Kamiyaku and Yaku merged to form the town of Yakushima. (3 towns)

Transportation
Yakushima Airport is located on Yakushima in Yakushima.
New Tanegashima Airport is located on Tanegashima in Nakatane.

Districts in Kagoshima Prefecture